Kishore Pawar (c. 1926 – 2 January 2013) was an Indian trade union leader and politician.

Pawar was close to Jayaprakash Narayan and involved in the Samyukta Maharashtra Movement also the Goa and Hyderabad freedom struggle. He died on 2 January 2013 in hospital at age 86.

References

1920s births
2013 deaths
Trade unionists from Maharashtra
Marathi politicians
Maharashtra politicians